Cesar Sanudo (October 26, 1943 – August 28, 2011) was a Mexican professional golfer who played on the PGA Tour and the Senior PGA Tour.

Golf career 
Sanudo was born and raised in Tijuana, Mexico with his four siblings. Like many other Hispanic professional golfers of the era, Sanudo got his start in golf by caddying. His first job was at Tijuana Country Club in 1954. During his teens he moved from Tijuana to San Diego and graduated from El Cajon High School in El Cajon, California. While in high school he improved on his golf game through San Diego's elite juniors program. Sanudo had an excellent amateur record, reaching the semi-final of the 1965 U.S. Amateur and winning the 1966 Mexican Amateur. He qualified for the 1966 Masters Tournament as an amateur.

Sanudo primarily played on tour between 1969 and 1982, vacillating between full-time and part-time status. His sole PGA Tour win came at the 1970 Azalea Open Invitational held in Cape Fear, North Carolina; he earned $12,000 for his efforts by defeating Bobby Mitchell by one stroke at 15-under-par 269. Sanudo described it as the proudest moment of his professional career. With the win, Sanudo became the first Mexican player to win on the PGA Tour. He was later followed by Victor Regalado in 1974 and Carlos Ortiz in 2020. 

Nearly two years after his PGA Tour victory, Sanudo seriously contended for a major championship for the only time. At the 1972 U.S. Open he was tied for the lead after two rounds. Over the weekend, in the high winds at Pebble Beach, he fell back considerably with scores of 78-77 but would still finish in the top 10. 

Sanudo finished second at the European Tour's 1974 Benson & Hedges Match Play Championship to Australia's Jack Newton. He defeated British golfers Maurice Bembridge and David Jagger on his way to reaching the finals. It was the only time he would finish runner-up on either the European Tour or PGA Tour.

By the mid-1970s, he lost his full-time playing status and worked in the used car business. He briefly regained full time status but after the 1981 season he would rarely play again on tour. After his PGA Tour playing days were over, Sanudo became a long-time club professional in El Cajon, California and later at the Coronado Municipal Golf Course.

Personal life 
Sanudo was in a relationship with Kris Houghton – now Kris Jenner – in the mid-1970s. After they broke up he married Jacqui Schenz and had three children with her: Amber, Anthony, and Lee. Lee is a local teaching professional. He was good friends with Lee Trevino and played golf with Presidents Nixon, Ford, and George H.W. Bush. Sanudo died in 2011 in La Mesa, California.

Amateur wins
1966 Mexican Amateur

Professional wins (2)

PGA Tour wins (1)

Other wins (1)
1973 Columbia Open

Results in major championships

Note: Sanudo never played in The Open Championship.

CUT = missed the half-way cut
"T" = tied

Source:

See also 

 1968 APG Tour Qualifying School graduates

References

External links

Mexican male golfers
Lamar Cardinals golfers
PGA Tour golfers
Golfers from San Diego
Sportspeople from El Cajon, California
1943 births
2011 deaths
20th-century Mexican people